Fadéla M'rabet (born 1935) is an Algerian writer, doctor of biology, teacher and feminist.

Biography
M'rabet was born in Skikda in 1935, and grew up in Constantine, Algeria.  Her family was religious Islamic and her father worked in the Algerian state radio station. M'rabet attended the University of Algiers where she got her degree and later attended university in Strasbourg where she completed a doctorate in biology. After university M'rabet worked as a teacher before joining the radio station with her father where she ran a women's program. Her work there inspired her first books La Femme algérienne and Les algériennes. She became known as a leading feminist in Algeria. As a result, she was dismissed from her job and moved to France where she has worked as a lecturer.

Bibliography
La Femme algérienne, 1965
Les algériennes, 1967
L'Algérie des illusions, 1973
Une femme d'ici et d'ailleurs, 2005
Une enfance singulière : récit, 2009
Le muezzin aux yeux bleus, 2013
Une poussière d'étoiles, 2014
Le bonheur d'être Algérien, 2019

Sources

1935 births
Living people
People from Skikda
Algerian women writers
University of Algiers alumni
People from Constantine, Algeria
21st-century Algerian people